Philip Max Raskin (1880–1944) was a 20th-century, Jewish, English and American poet.

Life
Raskin was born on December 24, 1880, in Shklov, Russia. After emigrating to England, he worked at the Leeds Health Department. In 1914, he published his first poetry collection, Songs of a Jew, and the following year, he immigrated to the United States. He continued to publish his own poetry, in English, Hebrew, and Yiddish, as well as an anthology of modern Jewish poetry. He died on February 6, 1944, in New York.

Works
 Songs of a Wanderer, George Routledge & Sons, 
 Anthology of Modern Jewish Poetry, Behrman's Jewish Book Shop, 1927

References

External links
Recording of some of Raskin's poems on Librivox Librivox

 Philip M. Raskin Select Poems

1880 births
1944 deaths
Jewish American poets
Jewish poets
People from Shklow District